The men's 3000 metres steeplechase event at the 2002 Asian Athletics Championships was held in Colombo, Sri Lanka on 10 August.

Results

References

2002 Asian Athletics Championships
Steeplechase at the Asian Athletics Championships